The Antenna Measurement Techniques Association (AMTA) is a non-profit professional organization for members involved in research and development of antenna and radar-scattering measurements.  The principal objective of AMTA is to provide a forum for the exchange of information on electromagnetic measurement techniques and problems.  AMTA's annual symposium record includes topics in measurement methods, instrumentation techniques, facility development, and accuracy assessments.

From the initial AMTA meeting, held in 1979, to the current year, marking the 41st annual symposium, the size of the meetings has grown steadily.  The membership has grown from 30 to 500 and the number of papers presented at the yearly symposium has grown from 20 to over 100.

Threads common throughout AMTA's history include understanding and quantifying accuracy limitations, improved diagnostic methods, cost-effective implementations, and novel solutions to challenging measurement problems.  These continuing needs are expected to spur new developments in future years.

AMTA also collaborates with other technical professional organizations such as the IEEE Antenna Propagation Society (AP-S) and EuCAP to host symposiums on antenna measurements in the United States and Europe.

AMTA offers its members an on-line archive of technical papers presented at its annual symposiums.

Sources 
EuCAP 2009
IEEE
IEEE Xplore

External links
Website

Professional associations based in the United States